Adavali railway station is a station on Konkan Railway. It is at a distance of  down from origin. The preceding station on the line is Nivasar railway station and the next station is Vilavade railway station.

References

Railway stations along Konkan Railway line
Railway stations in Ratnagiri district
Ratnagiri railway division